Michael Whittaker (born 12 September 1970) is a New Zealand coxswain.

At the 1995 World Rowing Championships in Tampere, Finland, Whittaker won a Silver medal in the coxed four, with Chris White, Andrew Matheson, Murdoch Dryden, and Chris McAsey. Whittaker is self-employed as a mortgage broker.

References

1970 births
Living people
New Zealand male rowers
World Rowing Championships medalists for New Zealand
Coxswains (rowing)